Mazar-i-Sharīf (Dari /), also known as Mazar-e Sharīf or simply Mazar, is the fourth-largest city in Afghanistan by population, with an estimated 500,207 residents in 2021. It is the capital of Balkh province and is linked by highways with Kunduz in the east, Kabul in the southeast, Herat in the southwest and Termez, Uzbekistan in the north. The city is also a tourist attraction because of its famous shrines as well as the Islamic and Hellenistic archeological sites. The ancient city of Balkh is also nearby.

The region around Mazar-i-Sharif has been historically part of Greater Khorasan and was controlled by the Tahirids followed by the Saffarids, Samanids, Ghaznavids, Ghurids, Ilkhanates, Timurids, and Khanate of Bukhara until 1751 when it became part of the Durrani Empire (although under autonomous emirs). Eventually the city passed to a few local rulers before becoming part of Afghanistan in 1849.

Mazar-i-Sharif is the regional hub of northern Afghanistan, located in close proximity to both Uzbekistan and Tajikistan. It is also home to an international airport. It has the highest percentage of built-up land (91%) of all the Afghan provincial capitals, and it has additional built-up area extending beyond the municipal boundary but forming a part of the larger urban area. The city was spared the devastation that occurred in the country's other large cities during the Soviet–Afghan War and subsequent civil war, and was long regarded as one of the safest cities in the country.

On 14 August 2021, Mazar-i-Sharif was seized by Taliban fighters, becoming the twenty-fifth provincial capital to be captured by the Taliban as part of the wider 2021 Taliban offensive.

Etymology
The name Mazar-i-Sharif means "tomb of the saint", a reference to the tomb of Hazrat Ali ibn Abi Talib, cousin, son-in-law and companion of the Islamic prophet Muhammad. The tomb is housed in the large, blue-tiled sanctuary and mosque in the center of the city known as the Shrine of Ali or the Blue Mosque.

History

Ancient period
The Achaemenids controlled the region from the sixth century BCE. Alexander the Great conquered the area but it was then incorporated into the Seleucid Empire after his death. The decline of the Seleucids consequently led to the emergence of the Greco-Bactrian kingdom. Around 130 BCE, the Sakas occupied the region and the Greco-Bactrian kingdom fell. The Yuezhi took Mazar-i-Sharif and the surrounding area which led to the creation of the Kushan Empire. The Sasanians subsequently controlled the area after the fall of the Kushans. The Islamic conquests reached Mazar-i-Sharif in 651 CE.

9th century until 1919
The region around Mazar-i-Sharif has been historically part of Greater Khorasan and was controlled by the Tahirids followed by the Saffarids, Samanids, Ghaznavids, Ghurids, Ilkhanates, Timurids, and Khanate of Bukhara. According to tradition, the city of Mazar-i-Sharif owes its existence to a dream. At the beginning of the 12th century, a local mullah had a dream in which Hazrat Ali ibn Abi Talib appeared to reveal that he had been secretly buried near the city of Balkh.

The famous Jalal al-Din Rumi was born in this area but like many historical figures his exact location of birth cannot be confirmed. His father Baha' Walad was descended from the first caliph Abu Bakr and was influenced by the ideas of Ahmad Ghazali, brother of the famous philosopher. Baha' Walad's sermons were published and still exist as Divine Sciences (Ma'arif). Rumi completed six books of mystical poetry and tales called Masnavi before he died in 1273.

After conducting researches in the 12th century, the Seljuk sultan Ahmed Sanjar ordered a city and shrine to be built on the location, where it stood until its destruction by Genghis Khan and his Mongol army in the 13th century. Although later rebuilt, Mazar stood in the shadow of its neighbor Balkh. During the nineteenth century, due to the absence of drainage systems and the weak economy of the region, the excess water of this area flooded many acres of the land in the vicinity of residential areas causing a malaria epidemic in the region. Thus the ruler of North Central Afghanistan decided to shift the capital of the city of Mazar-i-Sharif.

The city along with the region south of the Amu Darya became part of the Durrani Empire in around 1751 (although for the most part the region was controlled by autonomous Uzbek rulers). In the aftermath of the Bukharan-Durrani war of 1788–1790, one Qilich Ali Beg of Khulm formed a mini-empire stretching from Balkh to Aybak, Saighan, Kahmard, Darra-i Suf, and Qunduz. When he died in 1817, the Balkh and Mazar-i Sharif region became an independent city state with Aqcha as its dependency. In November 1837 the Bukharans conquered the city but Balkh was still able to retain autonomy. In 1849 the city was conquered and annexed into Afghanistan.

Late 20th century
During the 1980s Soviet–Afghan War, Mazar-i-Sharif was a strategic base for the Soviet Army as they used its airport to launch air strikes on mujahideen rebels. Mazar-i-Sharif was also the main city that linked to Soviet territory in the north, especially the roads leading to the Uzbek Soviet Socialist Republic. As a garrison for the Soviet-backed Afghan Army, the city was under the command of General Abdul Rashid Dostum. Mujahideen militias Hezbe Wahdat and Jamiat-e Islami both attempted to contest the city but were repelled by the Army.
Dostum mutinied against Mohammad Najibullah's government on March 19, 1992, shortly before its collapse, and formed his new party and militia, Junbish-e Milli. The party took over the city the next day. Afterwards Mazar-i-Sharif became the de facto capital of a relatively stable and secular proto-state in northern Afghanistan under the rule of Dostum. The city remained peaceful and prosperous, whilst rest of the nation disintegrated and was slowly taken over by fundamentalist Taliban forces. The city was called at the time a "glittering jewel in Afghanistan's battered crown". Money rolled in from foreign donors Russia, Turkey, newly independent Uzbekistan and others, with whom Dostum had established close relations. He printed his own currency for the region and established his own airline. The city remained relatively liberal as Kabul previously was, where activities such as coeducational schools and betting was legal as opposed to the Taliban dominated regions in the south of the country.

This peace was shattered in May 1997 when he was betrayed by one of his generals, warlord Abdul Malik Pahlawan who allied himself with the Taliban, forcing him to flee from Mazar-i-Sharif as the Taliban were getting ready to take the city through Pahlawan. Afterwards Pahlawan himself mutinied the Taliban on the deal and it was reported that between May and July 1997 that Pahlawan executed thousands of Taliban members, that he personally did many of the killings by slaughtering the prisoners as a revenge for the 1995 death of Abdul Ali Mazari. "He is widely believed to have been responsible for the brutal massacre of up to 3,000 Taliban prisoners after inviting them into Mazar-i-Sharif." Several of the Taliban escaped the slaughtering and reported what had happened. Meanwhile, Dostum came back and took the city again from Pahlawan.

However the Taliban retaliated in 1998 attacking the city and killing an estimated 8,000 non-combatants. At 10 am on 8 August 1998, the Taliban entered the city and for the next two days drove their pickup trucks "up and down the narrow streets of Mazar-i-Sharif shooting to the left and right and killing everything that moved—shop owners, cart pullers, women and children shoppers and even goats and donkeys." More than 8000 noncombatants were reported killed in Mazar-i-Sharif and later in Bamiyan. In addition, the Taliban were criticized for forbidding anyone from burying the corpses for the first six days (contrary to the injunctions of Islam, which demands immediate burial) while the remains rotted in the summer heat and were eaten by dogs. The Taliban also reportedly sought out and massacred members of the Hazara, while in control of Mazar.

Since 2001

Following the September 11 attacks in 2001, Mazar-i-Sharif was the first Afghan city to fall to the U.S.-backed Northern Alliance (United Front). The Taliban's defeat in Mazar quickly turned into a rout from the rest of the north and west of Afghanistan. After the Battle of Mazar-i-Sharif in November 2001, the city was officially captured by forces of the Northern Alliance. They were joined by the United States Special Operations Forces and supported by U.S. Air Force aircraft. As many as 3,000 Taliban fighters who surrendered were reportedly massacred by the Northern Alliance after the battle, and reports also place U.S. ground troops at the scene of the massacre. The Irish documentary Afghan Massacre: The Convoy of Death investigated these allegations. Filmmaker Doran claims that mass graves of thousands of victims were found by United Nations investigators. The Bush administration reportedly blocked investigations into the incident.

The city slowly came under the control of the Karzai administration after 2002, which is led by President Hamid Karzai. The 209th Corps (Shaheen) of the Afghan National Army is based at Mazar-i-Sharif, which provides military assistance to northern Afghanistan. The Afghan Border Police headquarters for the Northern Zone is also located in the city. Despite the security put in place, there are reports of Taliban activities and assassinations of tribal elders. Officials in Mazar-i-Sharif reported that between 20 and 30 Afghan tribal elders have been assassinated in Balkh Province in the last several years. There is no conclusive evidence as to who is behind it but majority of the victims are said to have been associated with the Hezb-i Islami political party.

Small-scale clashes between militias belonging to different commanders persisted throughout 2002, and were the focus of intensive UN peace-brokering and small arms disarmament programme. After some pressure, an office of the Afghan Independent Human Rights Commission opened an office in Mazar in April 2003. There were reports about northern Pashtun civilians being ethnically cleansed by the other groups, mainly by ethnic Tajiks, Hazaras and Uzbeks.

NATO-led peacekeeping forces in and around the city provided assistance to the Afghan government. ISAF Regional Command North, led by Germany, is stationed at Camp Marmal which lies next to Mazar-i-Sharif Airport. Since 2006, Provincial Reconstruction Team Mazar-i-Sharif had unit commanders from Sweden on loan to ISAF. Camp Nidaros, located within Camp Marmal, has soldiers from Latvia and Norway and is led by an ISAF-officer from Norway.

In 2006, the discovery of new Hellenistic remains was announced.

On April 1, 2011, ten foreign employees working for United Nations Assistance Mission in Afghanistan (UNAMA) were killed by angry demonstrators in the city. The demonstration was organized in retaliation to pastors Terry Jones and Wayne Sapp's March 21 Qur'an-burning in Florida, United States. Among the dead were five Nepalis, a Norwegian, Romanian and Swedish nationals, two of them were said to be decapitated. Terry Jones, the American pastor who was going to burn Islam's Holy Book, denied his responsibility for incitement. President Barack Obama strongly condemned both the Quran burning, calling it an act of "extreme intolerance and bigotry", and the "outrageous" attacks by protesters, referring to them as "an affront to human decency and dignity." "No religion tolerates the slaughter and beheading of innocent people, and there is no justification for such a dishonorable and deplorable act." U.S. legislators, including Senate Majority Leader Harry Reid, also condemned both the burning and the violence in reaction to it.

By July 2011 violence grew to a record high in the insurgency. In late July 2011, NATO troops also handed control of Mazar-i-Sharif to local forces amid rising security fears just days after it was hit by a deadly bombing. Mazar-i-Sharif is the sixth of seven areas to transition to Afghan control, but critics say the timing is political and there is skepticism over Afghan abilities to combat the Taliban insurgency.

On 10 November 2016, a suicide attacker rammed a truck bomb into the wall of the German consulate in Mazar-i-Sharif. Eight people were killed and more than a hundred others were injured.

On 21 April 2017, a coordinated Taliban attack killed more than 100 people at Camp Shaheen, the Afghan Army base in Mazar-i-Sharif.

In November 2018, VOA reported that 40 houses in Qazil Abad, an immediate suburb of Mazar-i-Sharif, used unexploded Soviet Grad surface-to-surface rockets as construction materials. As a result, several people were killed and wounded from explosions over the years. These rockets, left behind by the Soviet Army in 1989 at the end of the Soviet–Afghan War, were used as cheap building materials by the poor residents of the village. It was estimated that over 400 rockets were incorporated into the village as wall and ceiling beams, door-stoppers, and even footbridges used by children. When the rest of the world discovered this fact, the Danish demining group of the Danish Refugee Council visited the village and, after asking the residents, began demining and rebuilding the village, safely removing and disposing of the rockets through controlled detonation at the border with Uzbekistan.

President Ghani visited the city on 11 August 2021 to rally local warlords to fight the Taliban. On 14 August, the Taliban captured Mazar-i-Sharif along with Sharana and Asadabad, the provincial capitals of Paktika and Kunar provinces respectively. Local government forces and regional leaders Abdul Rashid Dostum and Atta Mohammad Noor fled to neighboring Uzbekistan.

On 21 April 2022, Islamic State – Khorasan Province killed 31 people by bombing a Shia mosque. A week later, 11 people were killed in a double bombing.

Mazar-i-Sharif is also known for the Afghan song Bia ke berem ba Mazar (Come let's go to Mazar) by Sarban.

Geography

Climate
Mazar-i-Sharif has a cold steppe climate (Köppen climate classification BSk) with hot summers and cold winters. Precipitation is low and mostly falls between December and April. The winters are cold with temperatures falling below freezing; it may snow from November through March.

Demographics

The city of Mazar-i-Sharif has a total population of 500,207, and is the fourth-largest city of Afghanistan by population. It has a total land area of 8,304 Hectares with 77,615 total number of dwellings.

The November 2003 issue of National Geographic magazine indicated the ethnic composition as Pashtuns 30%, Hazaras 10%, Tajiks 40%, Turkmens 10%, and Uzbeks 20%. Occasional ethnic violence has been reported in the region in the last decades, mainly between Pashtuns and the other groups. In 2011 news reports mentioned assassinations taking place in the area but with no evidence as to who is behind them.

The dominant language in Mazar-i-Sharif is Dari, followed by Pashto, and Uzbek.

Economy

Mazar-i-Sharif serves as the major trading center in northern Afghanistan. The local economy is dominated by trade, agriculture and Karakul sheep farming. Small-scale oil and gas exploitation have also boosted the city's prospects. It is also the location of consulates of India and Pakistan for trading and political links.

Main sights
The modern city of Mazar-i Sharif is centred around the Shrine of Ali. Much restored, it is one of Afghanistan's most glorious monuments. Outside Mazar-i Sharif lies the ancient city of Balkh. The city is a centre for the traditional buzkashi sport, and the Blue Mosque is the focus of northern Afghanistan's Nowruz celebration. Although most Muslims believe that the real grave of Ali is found within Imam Ali Mosque in Najaf, Iraq, others still come to Mazar-i-Sharif to pay respect.

 Airports
 Mazar-i-Sharif Airport – serves the population of Balkh Province and is also used by NATO-led forces, including the Afghan Air Force. It is being expanded to become the 4th international airport in Afghanistan.
 Mosques
 Shrine of Ali
 Parks and monuments
 Park-e-Ariana 
 Maulana Jalaludin Cultural Park
 Tashkurgan Palace
 Governors Palace
 Mazar-i-Sharif Gate
 Khalid Ibn-al Walid Park
 Universities
 Balkh University
 Aria University
 Sadat University
 Mawlana University
 Taj University
 Turkistan University
 Rah-e-Saadat University

Sports
Professional sports teams from Mazar-i-Sharif

 Stadiums
 Balkh Cricket Stadium
 Buzkashi Stadium

Infrastructure

Transportation

Rail

It became the first city in Afghanistan to connect itself by rail with a neighboring country. Rail service from Mazar-i-Sharif to Uzbekistan began in December 2011 and cargo on freight trains arrive at a station near Mazar-i-Sharif Airport, where the goods are reloaded onto trucks or airplanes and sent to their last destinations across Afghanistan.

Air
As of June 2016 Mazar-i-Sharif Airport had direct air connections to Kabul, Mashad, Tehran, and Istanbul.

Road
Highway AH76 links Mazar-i-Sharif to Sheberghan in the west, and Pul-e Khomri and Kabul to the south-east. Roads to the east link it to Kunduz. Roads to the north link it to the Uzbek border town Termez, where it becomes highway M39 going north to Samarkand and Tashkent. Roads to the south link it to Bamiyan Province and the mountainous range of central Afghanistan.

Notable people

 Emir Wazir Akbar Khan, buried in the city
 Emir Sher Ali Khan, buried in the city
 Ajab Khan Afridi, freedom fighter against the British Raj
 Morsal Obeidi (German-Afghan murder victim) – Born in Mazar-i-Sharif, moved to Germany at age three, and lived in Mazar-i-Sharif for eight months after her parents sent her there to Islamize her.
Zalmay Khalilzad (Afghan born American diplomat)
Wasef Bakhtari, Afghan poet of the Persian language, literary figure and intellectual, one of the first Persian poets to introduce she’r-e nimaa'i ("Nimaic poetry") to Afghan-Persian literature, grew up in Mazar-i-Sharif
Abdul Ali Mazari, ethnic Hazara and political leader of the Hezb-e Wahdat party, born in the village of Charkent, south of the northern city of Mazar-i-Sharif
Muhammad Mohaqiq, politician in Afghanistan as a member of the Afghanistan Parliament, founder and chairman of the People's Islamic Unity Party of Afghanistan
Atta Muhammad Nur, former mujahideen resistance commander for the Jamiat-e Islami against the Soviets and also commander in the United Front (Northern Alliance) under Ahmad Shah Massoud against the Taliban, also former Governor of Balkh Province (2004–2018), born in Mazar-i-Sharif
Farshad Noor, Afghan professional football player who plays as a midfielder for the Afghanistan national football team

Twin towns and sister cities
  Dushanbe, Tajikistan (since 1991)
  Mashhad, Iran

See also

 Battle of Qala-i-Jangi
 Balkh Province

References

Further reading
 'The Massacre in Mazar-i Sharif'. Report of Human Rights Watch, November 1998, Vol. 10, No. 7 (C). Retrieved 18 November 2017.
 
 Noble Shrine or MAZAR-I-SHARIF a pilgrimage city in Afghanistan
 Dupree, Nancy Hatch (1977): An Historical Guide to Afghanistan. 1st Edition: 1970. 2nd Edition. Revised and Enlarged. Afghan Tourist Organization.

External links

 
 

 
Balkh Province
Cities in Afghanistan
Cities in Central Asia
Populated places in Balkh Province
Populated places along the Silk Road
Provincial capitals in Afghanistan
Populated places with period of establishment missing